was a Japanese samurai of the Sengoku through Edo period. A retainer of Maeda Toshiie, he was the founder of one of the eight senior retainer families serving the Kaga han Maeda. Nagayori fought at the Battle of Nagashino.

He was succeeded by his son Murai Nagatsugu.

1543 births
1605 deaths
Samurai
Kaga-Maeda retainers